West Point is a town in Cullman County, Alabama, United States. At the 2010 census the population was 586, up from 295 in 2000. West Point was incorporated in October 1977.

Geography
West Point is located in northwest Cullman County at  (34.241338, -86.943126).

Demographics

As of the census of 2000, there were 295 people, 114 households, and 89 families residing in the town. The racial makeup of the town was 100.00% White. 0.68% of the population were Hispanic or Latino of any race.

There were 114 households, out of which 35.1% had children under the age of 18 living with them, 64.0% were married couples living together, 7.0% had a female householder with no husband present, and 21.9% were non-families. 21.1% of all households were made up of individuals, and 7.9% had someone living alone who was 65 years of age or older. The average household size was 2.59 and the average family size was 2.96.

In the town, the population was spread out, with 26.8% under the age of 18, 9.2% from 18 to 24, 27.1% from 25 to 44, 27.8% from 45 to 64, and 9.2% who were 65 years of age or older. The median age was 36 years. For every 100 females, there were 99.3 males. For every 100 females age 18 and over, there were 105.7 males.

The median income for a household in the town was $28,295, and the median income for a family was $36,875. Males had a median income of $24,821 versus $19,250 for females. The per capita income for the town was $14,963. About 11.0% of families and 12.7% of the population were below the poverty line, including 17.3% of those under the age of eighteen and 8.8% of those 65 or over.

Education
 West Point Elementary School (K-3)
 West Point Intermediate School (4-5)
 West Point Middle School (6-8)
 West Point High School (9-12)

All four schools are members of the Cullman County Board of Education.

References

Towns in Cullman County, Alabama
Towns in Alabama